Harpagocarpus is a monotypic genus of flowering plants belonging to the family Polygonaceae. The only species is Harpagocarpus snowdenii.

Its native range is Cameroon to Sudan and Tanzania.

References

Polygonaceae
Monotypic Polygonaceae genera